Tehran Museum of Contemporary Art, (Persian: موزه هنرهای معاصر تهران), also known as TMoCA, is among the largest art museums in Tehran and Iran. It has collections of more than 3,000 items that include 19th and 20th century's world-class European and American paintings, prints, drawings and sculptures. TMoCA also has one of the greatest collections of Iranian modern and contemporary art.

The museum was inaugurated by Empress Farah Pahlavi in 1977, just two years before the 1979 Revolution. TMoCA is considered to have the most valuable collections of modern Western masterpieces outside Europe and North America.

Background 
According to Farah Pahlavi, the former Empress of Iran, the idea for this museum happened when she was in conversation with artist Iran Darroudi during a gallery opening in the 1970s and Darroudi mentioned she wished there was a place to show work more permanently. The Tehran Museum of Contemporary Art museum was supposed to be a place to show contemporary and modern Iranian artist alongside other international artists doing similar work.

The museum was designed by Iranian architect and cousin of the queen, Kamran Diba, who employed elements from traditional Persian architecture. It was built adjacent to Laleh Park, Tehran, and was inaugurated in 1977. The building itself can be regarded as an example of contemporary art, in a style of an underground New York Guggenheim Museum. Most of the museum area is located underground with a circular walkway that spirals downwards with galleries branching outwards. Western sculptures by artists such as Ernst, Giacometti, Magritte and Moore can be found in the museum's gardens.

The selection of the art was done under Farah Pahlavi and the budget was from the National Iranian Oil Company. Pahlavi personally met many of the artists whose work was part of the museum collection, including the Western artists Marc Chagall, Salvador Dalí, Henry Moore, Paul Jenkins, Arnaldo Pomodoro. Some people involved in the process of selecting art were the Americans, Donna Stein and David Galloway, and Kamran Diba, the architect and director of the museum, and Karimpasha Bahadori, who was the Chief of Staff of the cabinet.

After the Iranian Revolution in 1979, the Western art was stored away in the museums vault until 1999 when the first post-revolution exhibition was held of western art showing artists such as David Hockney, Roy Lichtenstein, Robert Rauschenberg and Andy Warhol. Now pieces of the Western art collection are shown for a few weeks every year but due to the current conservative nature of the Iranian establishment, most pieces will never be shown.

It is considered to have the most valuable collection of Western modern art outside Europe and the United States, a collection largely assembled by founding curators David Galloway and Donna Stein under the patronage of Farah Pahlavi. It is said that there is approximately £2.5 billion worth of modern art held at the museum. The museum hosts a revolving program of exhibitions and occasionally organizes exhibitions by local artists.

Politics 
In 1977, the Empress of Iran, Farah Pahlavi, purchased expensive Western artwork, in order to open this contemporary art museum. This museum was a controversial act, because the country's social and economic inequalities were rising and the government at the time was acting as a dictatorship and not tolerating the rising opponents, a few years later the Iranian Revolution took place. A few art pieces did not survive the revolution including a public statue by Bahman Mohasses deemed un-Islamic and a 1977 Warhol painting, a portrait of Farah Pahlavi.

Le Monde art critic André Fermigier wrote an article in 1977 called "A museum for whom and for what?", "questioning the link between an Iranian child and a Picasso or a Pollock". And Farah Pahlavi responded to this criticism, noting that Iranians can understand modern art, not all Iranians were living in remote villages, and this issue with modern art was not unlike one that had existed in France.

A touring exhibitions was planned for autumn 2016 in Berlin, (Germany), consisting of a three-month tour of sixty artworks, half Western and half Iranian. The show was to run for three months in Berlin, then travel to the Maxxi Museum of 21st Century Arts in Rome for display from March through August. However, the plan has been indefinitely postponed because the Iranian authorities have failed to allow the paintings to leave the country, also noting after the revolution these painting have not yet been shown in Iran.

Collection curator Donna Stein wrote a memoir, The Empress and I: How an Ancient Empire Collected, Rejected and Rediscovered Modern Art (2021), because she felt she was not properly credited for her role in curating this collection.

Permanent collection

This is a list of artists featured in the permanent collection at Tehran Museum of Contemporary Art.

 Ansel Easton Adams: Canyon de Chelly
 Yaacov Agam: More than 10 oil and acrylic works
 Aydin Aghdashloo: Identity: in praise of Sandro Botticelli and other works
 Francis Bacon: Two Figures Lying on a Bed With Attendants
 Giacomo Balla
 Max Beckmann
 Georges Braque
 Alexander Calder
 Mary Cassatt
 Edgar Degas
 André Derain: Golden Age
 Jim Dine
 Marcel Duchamp
 André Dunoyer de Segonzac
 James Ensor
 Max Ernst: Capricorn
 Paul Gauguin: Still Life with Head-Shaped Vase and Japanese Woodcut
 Alberto Giacometti: Standing Woman, Walking Man 1
 Adolph Gottlieb
 George Grosz
 Richard Hamilton
 Noriyuki Haraguchi: Matter and Mind
 Edward Hopper
 John Hoyland
 Jasper Johns
 Donald Judd
 Wassily Kandinsky
 Abbas Kiarostami
 František Kupka
 Fernand Léger
 Roy Lichtenstein
 René Magritte: The Therapeutae
 Marino Marini: Horse and Rider
 Joan Miró
 Bahman Mohasses: Tryst
 Claude Monet
 Henry Moore: Two–Pieces Reclining Figure, Three–Pieces Reclining Figure, Oval with Points 
 Giorgio Morandi
 Noreen Motamed
 Edvard Munch
 Jules Pascin
 Peter Phillips
 Pablo Picasso: Baboon and Young, Painter and Model
 Camille Pissarro
 Jackson Pollock: Mural on Indian Red Ground
 Arnaldo Pomodoro
 Maurice Prendergast
 Pierre-Auguste Renoir: Gabrielle with Open Blouse
 Jean-Paul Riopelle
 Diego Rivera
 Henry Peach Robinson: Landing the Catch
 James Rosenquist
 Georges Rouault
 Sterling Ruby
 Ali Akbar Sadeghi: Myth & Math and Unwritten
 Sohrab Sepehri
 Pierre Soulages
 Parviz Tanavoli: Sanctified 1
 William Turnbull
 Louis Valtat
 Vincent van Gogh: At Eternity's Gate
 Victor Vasarely
 Édouard Vuillard
 Andy Warhol: Suicide (Purple Jumping Man), portraits of Mick Jagger, Marilyn Monroe, and Mao Zedong
 James Whistler
 Fritz Winter
 Manouchehr Yektai

See also
International rankings of Iran
Safir Office Machines Museum
Modern and contemporary art in Iran

References

External links
 
 

Contemporary Art
Architecture in Iran
Contemporary art galleries in Iran
Art museums established in 1977
1977 establishments in Iran
Art museums and galleries in Iran
Tourist attractions in Tehran